Rose Mountain is a mountain located in the Catskill Mountains of New York northeast of Pine Hill. Monka Hill is located west of Rose Mountain and Halcott Mountain is located north.

References

Mountains of Ulster County, New York
Mountains of New York (state)